UOB Kay Hian Holdings Limited is a Singapore-based, global investment bank that engages in brokerage services, private wealth management, investment banking, investment management and financial research. UOB Kay Hian was founded in the early 1900s by Khoo Kay Hian as Kay Hian & Co (Pte). 

It is headquartered at Singapore, with additional offices in Hong Kong, Shanghai, Jakarta, Manila, London, Toronto, Kuala Lumpur, Bangkok and New York City. Following its incorporation in June 1970 and the merger of Kay Hian Holdings with UOB Securities in October 2000, UOB Kay Hian Holdings was established.

History
In the early 1900s, Khoo Kay Hian established a stockbroking film, Kay Hian & Co, to deal in commodities and securities. Kay Hian & Co was one of the founding members of the Singapore Stockbrokers Association. The company was incorporated as a private company, Kay Hian & Co (Pte),  in June 1970.

After the Stock Exchange of Malaysia and Singapore was split into two stock exchanges in Singapore and Malaysia, Kay Hian & Co (Pte) became a member of the Stock Exchange of Singapore (SES).

In August 1987, the company was subsequently renamed Kay Hian Pte Ltd.

On 5 January 1989, James Capel International Holdings BV was approved by the SES to take up 30% equity stake of Kay Hian Pte Ltd. In June, James Capel Singapore Holdings Pte Ltd merged with Kay Hian Pte Ltd and the company was renamed Kay Hian James Capel (KHJC). In October 1990, KHJC issued 25% of its equity to the public and was listed on the SES.
On 1 Aug 1996, HSBC James Capel group reduced its stake in KHJC and the company was renamed as Kay Hian Holdings Ltd.

In 1999, Kay Hian Holdings Ltd managed to secure a seat on the Stock Exchange of Hong Kong.

On 27 September 2000, United Overseas Bank Securities Pte Ltd's and Kay Hian's shareholders approved the merger of both companies. The merger includes Kay Hian Holdings Ltd, UOB Securities Pte Ltd and The United Overseas Bank Group's overseas stockbroking interests (including Hong Kong, Thailand, Indonesia and the Philippines). The merger was approved by the High Court of Singapore and was effective on 21 October. In January 2001, the merged company was named UOB-Kay Hian Holdings Ltd.

In March 2001, Kay Hian Overseas Securities Ltd and United Mok Ying Kie Ltd were merged.

In May 2002, OUB Securities (Hong Kong) Ltd and UOB Kay Hian (Hong Kong) Ltd were merged.

In Jun 2005,UOB Kay Hian Securities (Thailand) Public Company Limited was listed on Stock Exchange of Thailand.

References

External links
UOB Kay Hian Corporate

2000 establishments in Singapore
Banks of Singapore
Companies established in 2000
Investment banks
Companies listed on the Singapore Exchange
Online brokerages
Singaporean companies established in 2000